Kevin J. McGee is a Republican member of the Mississippi House of Representatives from Brandon, Mississippi.

References

Living people
Republican Party members of the Mississippi House of Representatives
Year of birth missing (living people)